A marron glacé (plural marrons glacés) is a confection, originating in northern Italy and southern France consisting of a chestnut candied in sugar syrup and glazed. Marrons glacés are an ingredient in many desserts and are also eaten on their own.

History
Candied chestnuts appeared in chestnut-growing areas in northern Italy and southern France shortly after the crusaders returned to Europe with sugar. Cooking with sugar allowed creation of new confectioneries. A candied chestnut confection was probably served around the beginning of the 15th century in Piedmont, among other places. But marrons glacés as such (with the last touch of 'glazing'), may have been created only in the 16th century. Lyon and Cuneo dispute the title for the addition of the glazing, or icing, that makes the real marron glacé.

The earliest known records of a recipe for marron glacés were written during the 16th century by an Italian cook who worked for Charles Emmanuel I, Duke of Savoy in 1580, and by the French at the end of the 17th century in Louis XIV's court at Versailles. In 1667, François Pierre La Varenne, ten years' chef de cuisine to Nicolas Chalon du Blé, Marquis of Uxelles (near Lyon and a chestnut-producing area), and foremost figure of the nouvelle cuisine movement of the time, published his best-selling book Le parfaict confiturier. In it he describes "la façon de faire marron pour tirer au sec" ("the way to make (a) chestnut (so as) to 'pull it dry'"); this may well be the first record of the recipe for marrons glacés. "Tirer au sec" means, in a confectionery context, "to remove (what's being candied) from the syrup". La Varenne's book was edited thirty times over seventy-five years.

Nevertheless, that book was not mentioned (nor indeed any other) when the recipe, applied to cocoa beans, was in 1694 passed on to Jean-Baptiste Labat, a French missionary in Martinique. That year he wrote in a letter of a recipe for candied and iced cocoa beans which he had tasted when dining at a M. Pocquet's. Another early citation, still in French, is from 1690.

Towards the end of the 19th century, Lyon was suffering from the collapse of the textile market, notably silk. In the midst of this crisis, Clément Faugier, a bridge and roadworks engineer, was looking for a way to revitalize the regional economy. In 1882 in Privas, Ardèche, he and a local confectioner set up the first factory with the technology to produce marrons glacés industrially (though many of the nearly twenty steps necessary from harvest to finished product are still performed manually). Three years later he introduced the crème de marrons de l'Ardèche, a sweetened chestnut purée made from marrons glacés broken during the production process, flavoured with vanilla. (later came Marrons au Cognac in 1924, Purée de Marrons Nature in 1934, Marrons au Naturel in 1951, and Marpom's in 1994.)

The same process was used in 1980 by José Posada in Ourense, Spain. He was the first businessman to build a factory to produce Spanish marrons glacés using Galician raw chestnuts, which previously were exported to France to produce the confectionery. Posada used the French and Italian formula to produce the marrons glacés. Today, there are two factories that produce marrons glacés in Spain.

Châtaigne or marron
The French refer to chestnuts as châtaigne or marron. Both terms refer to the fruit of the sweet chestnut Castanea sativa. However, marron tends to denote a higher quality, larger fruit that is more easily peeled. The fifth edition of the dictionary Dictionnaire de l'Académie française. Revu, corrigé et augmenté published in 1798 states that a marron glacé is a confit marron that is covered in caramel. The 1767 book L'agronome, ou dictionnaire portatif du cultivateur claimed that the best marrons came from the Dauphiné region in southeastern France, and contained instructions for preparing marron glacés.

Chestnuts are covered with a membrane, known as a pellicle or episperm, which closely adheres to the fruit's flesh and must be removed because of its astringency. Marron nuts have a pellicle which is "superficially attached to the nut", making it easily removable from the fruit. Some chestnuts have two cotyledons usually separated with deep grooves penetrating nearly all the way through the fruit; this makes them too fragile for the necessary manipulations during the cooking process. There also are other grooves on the surface, which means more embedded pellicle that must be painstakingly removed. "Marron"-quality nuts do not have the separation into two cotyledons; it appears in one piece and it shows few very shallow grooves.

In Italy, the term marron denotes a specific high-quality cultivar of Castanea sativa bearing oblong fruits with a shiny, reddish epicarp and often exhibiting a small rectangular hilar scar. As with the French use of the term, there should be no division of the cotyledons.

Marron-quality nuts for marrons glacés may be three or four times more expensive than the châtaigne because they also have a lower yield as the husk usually contains only one or two nuts and the plants have sterile male flowers.

Uses

Marrons glacés may be eaten on their own.

Crème de marrons are a staple ingredient for other desserts, such as the Mont Blanc (puréed with cream), ice creams, cakes, sweet sauce or garnish for other desserts.

Cultural references

In the short story Reginald (1901) by Saki, the narrator leaves Reginald "near a seductive dish of marrons glacés" at a garden-party in the vain hope that these delicacies will distract him from wreaking social havoc.

In the Overture to Swann's Way, Marcel Proust refers to M. Swann bringing to Marcel's great-aunt on New Year's Day a little packet of marrons glacés.

In Patrick Skene Catling's children's book, The Chocolate Touch, marrons glacés are among the candies listed as the sweet-toothed young protagonist's favourite confectionery delights.

In the 1899 novel The Awakening by Kate Chopin, on a comfortable night as Edna Pontellier dines alone, she describes marrons glacé as "just what she wanted".

In the 1936 film Camille, Greta Garbo's character asks for "sweets", and Robert Taylor's character goes to some trouble to find fresh marrons glacés for her.

In the British television drama series Victoria, Queen Victoria played by Jenna Coleman repeatedly calls marrons glacés her "favourite".

In the 2021 Wes Anderson film The French Dispatch, Adrien Brody's character uses marrons glacés to bribe the prison guard for access to Benicio del Toro's character in prison.

In the 1971 novel Nemesis by Agatha Christie, "My tastes would be a little more moderate than that," said Miss Marple. "Partridges," she said thoughtfully, "it is very difficult to get partridges nowadays, and they're very expensive. I should enjoy a partridge—a whole partridge—to myself, very much. A box of marrons glacés is an expensive taste which I cannot often gratify. Possibly a visit to the opera. It means a car to take one to Covent Garden and back, and the expense of a night in a hotel."

Local variants

Turkey

Candied chestnuts are a speciality of Bursa, Turkey, where they are called kestane şekeri 'chestnut candy'.

See also
 
 Lyonnaise cuisine

Notes

French confectionery
Italian desserts
Turkish desserts
Culture in Bursa
Chestnut dishes
Nut confections